Troy Pride Jr. (born January 19, 1998) is an American football cornerback for the New Orleans Saints of the National Football League (NFL). He played college football at Notre Dame.

Early life and high school
Pride grew up in Greer, South Carolina and attended Greer High School. As a senior, Pride caught 41 passes for 848 yards and 13 touchdowns, rushed for 197 yards and three touchdowns, returned three punts for touchdowns and intercepted three passes on defense with one returned for a touchdown. He originally committed to play college football at Virginia Tech, but de-committed after the retirement of head coach Frank Beamer. He ultimately committed to Notre Dame over offers from North Carolina, Virginia Tech, Ole Miss, Tennessee, and Clemson.

College career
Pride played in eight games with three starts for the Fighting Irish as a true freshman, making 12 tackles with a fumble recovery. As a sophomore, he recorded 22 tackles and one tackle for loss with an interception and two passes broken up. As a junior, Pride made 47 tackles and finished second on the team with 10 passes defended and two interceptions. As a senior, Pride was named All-Independent by Pro Football Focus after making 37 tackles with an interception and five passes defended and holding quarterbacks to a 50.9% completion rate on passes thrown into his coverage. Pride finished his collegiate career with 121 tackles, 18 passes broken up and four interceptions with one forced fumble and two fumbles recovered in 45 games played.

Pride was also a sprinter for the Notre Dame track team. He competed in the 60-meter dash final at the 2018 Atlantic Coast Conference Indoor Track and Field Championship.

Professional career

Carolina Panthers
Pride was selected by the Carolina Panthers in the fourth round with the 113th pick of the 2020 NFL Draft. Pride made his NFL debut on September 13, 2020, in the season opener against the Las Vegas Raiders, starting the game and making seven total tackles in a 34-30 loss. On January 2, 2021, Pride was placed on injured reserve. He finished the season with 41 tackles and two pass deflections.

On August 17, 2021, Pride was placed on injured reserve after suffering a knee injury in the preseason.

On May 16, 2022, Pride was waived by the Panthers after failing his physical.

New Orleans Saints
On January 11, 2023, Pride signed a reserve/future contract with the New Orleans Saints.

References

External links
Notre Dame Fighting Irish bio

1998 births
Living people
Players of American football from South Carolina
People from Greer, South Carolina
American football cornerbacks
Notre Dame Fighting Irish men's track and field athletes
Notre Dame Fighting Irish football players
Carolina Panthers players
New Orleans Saints players